St. Wenceslaus Catholic Church is a Catholic parish church of the Archdiocese of Baltimore located in the Middle East neighborhood of Baltimore, Maryland. It is administered by the Josephites and serves a primarily African-American congregation.

History
St. Wenceslaus was founded in 1872 in a neighborhood of East Baltimore that was then known as Little Bohemia.  The parish was created primarily to serve the Bohemian (Czech) community in Baltimore.  As suggested by parish records (which begin around May 1872), a significant number of early attendees came from South Bohemia around Milevsko, as well as the Plzeň Region south of Nepomuk (especially Pačejov and Myslív). Also attending included Slovaks, especially from the parish of Studienka (also known as Szentistván), Švábovce (including Hôrka and Ondrej (also known as Szent-András)), Lakšárska Nová Ves (including Mikulášov, also known as Niklhof), and Horné Orešany (also known as Felsődiós). Church services were originally held in both the English and Czech languages.  

The present church was built in 1914, and at that time the church had 7,000 Bohemian Catholic members.  By 1920 the church was the fourth largest in the Archdiocese of Baltimore.

In recent years, the ethnic character of St. Wenceslaus parish has undergone a gradual change from a majority Czech parish to one that is multicultural and multiracial, first as many Poles and Lithuanians moved into the neighborhood, and then as the neighborhood shifted to having an African-American majority.

St. Wenceslaus was founded and staffed by priests and lay brothers of the Congregation of the Most Holy Redeemer, known as the Redemptorists, until 1999. Later, it was administered by friars of the Franciscan Third Order Regular, and as of 2022 is under the leadership of the Josephites.

Architecture
The building's overall design is in the Italianate style.

Notable attendees 

 John Fick, baseball player
 August Klecka, politician

Parish records online 
Births and baptisms 1872-1892 (with additional information back to 1868)

Marriages 1872-1978

Deaths and burials 1880-1979

See also
Black Catholicism
History of the Czechs in Baltimore
Catholicism in the Czech Republic

References

External links

 Archdiocese of Baltimore website
 St. Wenceslaus Roman Catholic Church Website
 Image of the church
 St. Wenceslaus evangelization still knocking
 Faith keeps broken neighborhood together

1872 establishments in Maryland
African-American history in Baltimore
African-American Roman Catholic churches
Czech-American culture in Baltimore
Franciscan churches in the United States
Italianate architecture in Maryland
Lithuanian-American culture in Baltimore
Middle East, Baltimore
Polish-American culture in Baltimore
Redemptorist churches in the United States
Roman Catholic churches completed in 1914
Religious organizations established in 1872
Roman Catholic churches in Baltimore
Roman Catholic Ecclesiastical Province of Baltimore
Slovak-American culture in Maryland
Wenceslaus I, Duke of Bohemia
20th-century Roman Catholic church buildings in the United States
Italianate church buildings in the United States
Josephite churches in the United States